James Glasspool (born 8 June 1991) is an Australian former professional road racing cyclist, who competed professionally for  in 2015 and 2016. He now works as a coach for the South Australian Sports Institute (SASI).

Biography 
Glasspool was born, raised, and resides in Adelaide, South Australia, Australia. At the age of eleven, he was diagnosed with type 1 diabetes.

Between 2009 and 2012, Glasspool claimed five track titles. He finished ninth in the 1 km time trial at the 2012 UCI World Track Championships. In 2014, Glasspool progressed from track to road cycling; he signed with Team Novo Nordisk Development.

Major results
Sources:

2009
1st  National Junior 1 km Time Trial Championships
2nd National Junior Sprint Championships 
2010
1st  National Team Pursuit Championships (with Dale Parker, Jack Bobridge, and Rohan Dennis)
2nd National Junior 1 km Time Trial Championships 
2nd Oceania Team Sprint Championships (with Dan Ellis and Joel Leonard)
3rd Oceania 1 km Time Trial Championships
3rd National Junior Sprint Championships 
2011
1st  National Team Sprint Championships (with Nathan Corrigan-Martella and Matthew Glaetzer)
2nd Oceania 1 km Time Trial Championships
2nd National 1 km Time Trial Championships
2012
1st  National Team Sprint Championships (with Nathan Corrigan-Martella and Matthew Glaetzer)
1st  National 1 km Time Trial Championships
2nd Oceania 1 km Time Trial Championships 
3rd Oceania Team Sprint Championships (with Nathan Corrigan-Martella and Matthew Glaetzer)
9th UCI World 1 km Time Trial Championships
2013
3rd National Sprint Championships

References

External links

Cycling Base: James Glasspool
Cycling Quotient: James Glasspool

Team Novo Nordisk: James Glasspool

1991 births
Living people
Australian male cyclists
Cyclists from Adelaide